Coco d'Or is a jazz band, fronted by Hiroko Shimabukuro. Hiroko, also known as hiro or Abigail, is a member of the popular Okinawan group Speed.

Coco d'Or's debut self-titled album was released on 4 August 2004. A companion album entitled Coco d'Or Parfait, which contained the same songs along with three new songs, was released four months later. There is also a CD/DVD version that includes promotional videos and making of spots. Their second album was released on July 26, 2006. The title is Coco d'Or 2. An only CD version as well as a CD/DVD version with two music videos was available. A third album has been announced for release in March 2011.

Coco d'Or songs are modern remakes of popular classic jazz songs, such as "Misty" by Ella Fitzgerald and "Fly Me To The Moon" by Frank Sinatra.

Discography

Coco d'Or track list
"Route 66" 
"Avalon"
"And The Melody Still Lingers On (Night In Tunisia)"
"Free"
"Fly Me To The Moon"
"Summertime"
"The Face I Love"
"The Girl From Ipanema"
"It's Only A Paper Moon"
"Orange Colored Sky"
"The Very Thought Of You"
"I Can Recall (Spain)"
"You'd Be So Nice To Come Home To"
"I Can't Give You Anything But Love"
"You're Everything"
"Calling You"

Coco d'Or Parfait
Coco d'Or Parfait is a re-release of Coco d'Or, and was released on January 1, 2005. It includes all the songs from Coco d'Or, plus three new tracks, "Misty", "Lullaby Of Birdland", and "Doralice", as well as a DVD containing the video clips of "Fly Me To The Moon" and "Orange Colored Sky".

Coco d'Or 2 track listing
Coco d'Or 2 is the second album from Coco d'Or, and was released on July 26, 2006.

What A Wonderful World
La-La Means I Love You
Ay! Cosita Linda(Merecumbe)
By The Way
Time After Time
Just The Two Of Us
(They Long To Be)Close To You
Easy
I Will Survive
Killing Me Softly With His Song
Roda
Is It You?
Carnaval
One Love / People Get Ready

Coco d'Or 3

After a 5-year break, hiro will release her third Coco d'Or album in March 2011. It is arranged by Dave Matthews and come in a CD-only version as well as a version containing a DVD with the music video for "Alfie" as well as backstage footage.

Unforgettable
don't know why
Candy
Satin doll
Alfie
Carnival
How crazy are you?
Tea for two feat.blanc.
Come on a my house
All of me
Over the rainbow
The Christmas song (Bonus track)

External links
Official Website

Japanese pop music groups
Musical groups from Okinawa Prefecture